Unarvu is a 2019 Indian Tamil-language political drama film directed by Subu Venkat. It stars Suman, Aroul D. Shankar, Ankitha Navya and Shinav. Featuring music composed by Nakul Abhyankar, the film was released on 19 July 2019.

Cast
Suman as Muthuswamy, the Chief Minister 
Aroul D. Shankar as Prabhakaran, the corrupt Chief Minister
Ankitha Navya as Nikitha
Shinav as Sathish
Kanthasamy as Mani
Venkat Bharadwaj as Ramadorai
Kottachi as Content Manager
Bala Guru
Navaneethan
Sunny Madhavan
Natigar Shivashankar

Production
The political drama film marked the first Tamil venture of director Venkat Bharadwaj, who had earlier made a A Day in the City and Kempirve (2017) in Kannada. The director changed his stagename from Venkat Bharadwaj to Subu Venkat, for the Tamil audience. He cast six important characters in the lead roles, including veteran actor Suman, model Ankitha Navya, Shinav and Aroul Shankar, who had previously featured in Yaman.

Prior to release, the film was screened at the Berlin Film Festival, Dadasaheb Phalke Film Festival and Kalasamrudhi Festival in Mumbai.

Soundtrack
The film's soundtrack was composed by Nakul Abhyankar, an erstwhile assistant of A. R. Rahman. The songs were released in an audio function where Drums Sivamani appeared as a chief guest.

"Naanum Neeyum" - Karthik
"Enda Poovum" - Ramya Bhat
"Whistle Podu" - Bamba Bakya

Release
The film had a low profile opening across Tamil Nadu on 19 July 2019. In its review, The Times of India noted "the film is high on melodrama and tiring preachy dialogues which tests one’s patience". News Today gave the film a mixed review, claiming "had the director focused more on the second half, Unarvu would have been a must-watch."

The makers initially planned to dub the film into the Hindi language, but eventually did not do so.

References

External links

2019 films
2010s Tamil-language films
Indian drama films
2019 drama films